Reverse bluescreen is a special effects technique pioneered by Jonathan Erland of Apogee Inc. (John Dykstra's company) for shooting the flying sequences in the film Firefox. Erland received Academy Awards for this technique.

The model aircraft was coated with a phosphorescent paint which was transparent and invisible under naturalistic lighting. Using a motion controlled camera loaded with color film, the miniature was first photographed under illumination made to resemble bright sunlight against a jet-black background. Then, the camera loaded with high-contrast B&W film, the model was rephotographed with exactly the same motions, again with a black background, but illuminated by bright ultraviolet light (a blacklight). This caused the phosphorescent paint to glow evenly, and the model registered as a featureless white silhouette. This was the background matte element. A negative print provided the foreground matte.   

The technique was useful for compositing the rather shiny, gleaming model aircraft with background elements. The bluescreen technique would have been problematic, since the shiny model would have caught an unmanageable amount of blue spillage on its surface.

Special effects
Film and video technology